Kettle Valley is on the south side of the Kettle River in the Boundary region of south central British Columbia.

Name origin
The name came from the Kettle Valley Railway presence.

Railway
The final passenger train ran in 1964.

Community
The post office operated 1913–1975. By 1918, the rural hamlet also had an Anglican church and population of 60. Nowadays, most residences lie south of the river, across the concrete-decked bridge which replaced the war-surplus Bailey bridge in 2001.

References

Designated places in British Columbia
Populated places in the Boundary Country
Unincorporated settlements in British Columbia